The following television stations broadcast on digital channel 24 in Mexico:

 XHAE-TDT in Saltillo, Coahuila de Zaragoza
 XHCAM-TDT in Campeche, Campeche 
 XHCBM-TDT in Pátzcuaro, Michoacán de Ocampo 
 XHCER-TDT in Chilpancingo, Guerrero 
 XHCGC-TDT in Nuevo Casas Grandes, Chihuahua 
 XHCHZ-TDT in Chihuahua, Chihuahua 
 XHCTDG-TDT in Durango, Durango
 XHCTEN-TDT in Ensenada, Baja California
 XHCTOB-TDT in Ciudad Obregón, Sonora
 XHCTTR-TDT in Torreón, Coahuila
 XHCUI-TDT in Culiacán, Sinaloa 
 XHCV-TDT in Coatzacoalcos, Veracruz de Ignacio de la Llave 
 XHCVT-TDT in Ciudad Victoria, Tamaulipas 
 XHFM-TDT in Veracruz, Veracruz de Ignacio de la Llave 
 XHGA-TDT in Guadalajara, Jalisco 
 XHGAT-TDT in Atarjea, Guanajuato 
 XHGCN-TDT in Coroneo, Guanajuato 
 XHGDM-TDT in Dr. Mora, Guanajuato 
 XHGNB-TDT in Guerrero Negro, Baja California Sur
 XHGZG-TDT in Ciudad Guzmán, Jalisco 
 XHHC-TDT in Monclova, Coahuila de Zaragoza 
 XHHSS-TDT in Hermosillo, Sonora 
 XHIMT-TDT in Mexico City
 XHINC-TDT in Santiago Pinotepa Nacional, Oaxaca 
 XHJCC-TDT in San José del Cabo, Baja California Sur 
 XHJCH-TDT in Ciudad Jiménez, Chihuahua 
 XHLEJ-TDT in León, Guanajuato
 XHNOA-TDT in Nogales, Sonora
 XHPUR-TDT in Puebla, Puebla
 XHSLP-TDT in San Luis Potosí, San Luis Potosí 
 XHSMA-TDT in San Miguel de Allende, Guanajuato 
 XHSRB-TDT in Santa Rosalía, Baja California Sur
 XHTGN-TDT in Tulancingo, Hidalgo
 XHTMYC-TDT in Mérida, Yucatán
 XHTPG-TDT in Tepic, Nayarit 
 XHTX-TDT in Tuxtla Gutiérrez, Chiapas 
 XHTZL-TDT in Tamazunchale, San Luis Potosí 
 XHVAD-TDT in Valladolid, Yucatán 
 XHZHZ-TDT in Zacatecas, Zacatecas

24